The Wagner Seahawks college football team represents Wagner College. The Seahawks currently compete in the NCAA Division I Football Championship Subdivision (FCS) and are members of the Northeast Conference. The Seahawks’ conference affiliations have been:

 1927: Independent
 1928–1929: Metropolitan Collegiate Conference
 1930–1957: Independent
 1958–1974: Middle Atlantic States Collegiate Athletic Corporation
 1972–1977: Metropolitan Intercollegiate Conference
 1978–1991: Division III Independent
 1992: Liberty Football Conference
 1993–1995: NCAA Division I–AA Independent
 1996–present: Northeast Conference

Through the 2019 season, the program has had 12 identifiable head coaches since 1927, including one who had multiple tenures, and one season in which there were co-head coaches.

Tom Masella is the team's current head coach.

References

Wagner

Wagner Football Coaches
Staten Island-related lists